Senai Berhane (born 18 April 1989) is an Eritrean footballer who plays for Swedish club Sundbybergs IK. He plays as both a defender and a midfielder.

References

1989 births
Living people
Eritrean footballers
Eritrea international footballers
Sundbybergs IK players
Association football defenders
Association football midfielders
Eritrean expatriate footballers
Eritrean expatriate sportspeople in Sweden
Expatriate footballers in Sweden